Kalymnos is one of the regional units of Greece. It is part of the region of South Aegean. The regional unit covers the islands of Kalymnos, Agathonisi, Astypalaia, Leipsoi, Leros, Patmos and several smaller islands in the Aegean Sea.

Administration

As a part of the 2011 Kallikratis government reform, the regional unit Kalymnos was created out of part of the former Dodecanese Prefecture. It is subdivided into 6 municipalities. These are (number as in the map in the infobox):

 Agathonisi (2)
 Astypalaia (3)
 Kalymnos (4)
 Leipsoi (8)
 Leros (9)
 Patmos (12)

Province
The province of Kalymnos was one of the provinces of the Dodecanese Prefecture. It had the same territory as the present regional unit. It was abolished in 2006.

References

 
2011 establishments in Greece
Regional units of the South Aegean
Provinces of Greece